The Hyundai Celesta is a compact car produced by the Beijing Hyundai joint venture since 2017, replacing the extended production of the Hyundai Elantra Yuedong.

Overview

Celesta
Unveiled on the 2016 Guangzhou Auto Show, the Celesta is essentially a restyled and updated Hyundai Elantra Yuedong (A continuation of the fourth generation Hyundai Elantra). Production of the fourth generation Hyundai Elantra in South Korea ended in 2010, but production was carried on in China by the Beijing Hyundai joint venture. The Celesta would be sold alongside its predecessor, the Hyundai Elantra Yuedong, and sit slightly higher in the market.

There is only one engine available for the Celesta, which is a 1.6-litre engine producing , mated to a 6-speed automatic transmission or a 6-speed manual transmission.

Celesta RV
A station wagon version of the Celesta called the Celesta RV was launched in September 2018.

Powertrain

References

External links 

 (Yuedong 悦动, sedan)
 (Yixing 逸行, wagon)

2010s cars
Cars introduced in 2017
Cars of China
Compact cars
Front-wheel-drive vehicles
Celesta
Sedans
Station wagons